Phtheochroa sociana is a species of moth of the family Tortricidae. It is found on the Crimea and in Georgia and the Near East.

The wingspan is 11–14 mm. Adults have been recorded on wing from May to June.

References

Moths described in 1988
Phtheochroa